Rhaponticum scariosum, common name Giant Scabiosa, is a perennial herbaceous flowering plant of the genus Rhaponticum of the family Asteraceae.

Description
The biological form of Rhaponticum scariosum is hemicryptophyte scapose, as its overwintering buds are situated just below the soil surface and the floral axis is more or less erect with a few leaves.

Rhaponticum scariosum reaches on average  in height. The strong, thick, upright stem is leafy and hairy, woolly-tomentose and usually has only one inflorescence. The leaves are green, while its underside is white-tomentose, with irregularly toothed edges. The bracts are brownish and scarious. The flowering period extends from June to August.The flowers are hermaphroditic and are pollinated by insects. The fruits are brown achenes.

Distribution
This quite rare plant occurs in Italy, France, Switzerland, Austria and Slovenia.

Habitat
It grows in sub-alpine and alpine meadows, stony slopes and thickets. This plant prefers slightly moist and mostly calcareous soils, at altitudes from 750 to 2500 meters.

Gallery

Synonyms
Centaurea rhapontica L., Sp. Pl. 2: 915. 1753.
Centaurea scariosa (Lam.) Rouy, Fl. France 9: 114. 1905.
Leuzea rhapontica (L.) Holub, Folia Geobot. Phytotax. (Praha) 8:392. 1973.
Rhapontica rhapontica Hill, Hort. Kew. 69. 1768, nom. illeg.
Rhaponticum rhaponticum (L.) Voss, Vilm. Blumengärtn., ed. 3. 1: 554. 1894, nom. illeg.
Serratula rhapontica (L.) DC., Fl. Franc. (Candolle & Lamarck), ed. 3. 4: 87. 1805.
Stemmacantha rhapontica (L.) Dittrich, Candollea 39(1): 49. 1984.
Rhaponticum scariosum subsp. lamarckii (Dittrich) Greuter, Willdenowia 33(1): 61. 2003.
Stemmacantha rhapontica subsp. lamarckii Dittrich, Candollea 39: 49. 1984, nom. illeg.

References

 Josef Holub - Contribution to the taxonomy and nomenclature of Leuzea DC. and Rhaponticum auct - Folia Geobotanica - Vol. 1 / 1966 - Vol. 46 / 2011
 Leuzea rhapontica
 Hidalgo, O & al. 2006. Phylogeny of Rhaponticum (Asteraceae, Cardueae–Centaureinae) and Related Genera Inferred from Nuclear and Chloroplast DNA Sequence Data

External links
 Botanical Records
 Rare Plants
 Acta Plantarum

Cynareae